Tricolia fordiana is a species of small sea snail with calcareous opercula, a marine gastropod mollusk in the family Phasianellidae, the pheasant snails.

Description
The height of the shell varies between 2 mm and 5 mm.

Distribution
This marine species occurs in the Central Indo- West Pacific region and off Australia.

References

 Wilson, B., 1993. Australian Marine Shells. Prosobranch Gastropods. Odyssey Publishing, Kallaroo, West Australia.

External links
 To Biodiversity Heritage Library (2 publications)
 To World Register of Marine Species

Phasianellidae
Gastropods described in 1888